Phosphatidylinositol-4-phosphate 5-kinase type-1 gamma is an enzyme that in humans is encoded by the PIP5K1C gene.

This gene encodes a member of the type I phosphatidylinositol-4-phosphate 5-kinase family of enzymes. A similar protein in mice is found in synapses and focal adhesion plaques, and binds the FERM domain of talin through its C-terminus.

Model organisms

Model organisms have been used in the study of PIP5K1C function. A conditional knockout mouse line, called Pip5k1ctm1a(KOMP)Wtsi was generated as part of the International Knockout Mouse Consortium program — a high-throughput mutagenesis project to generate and distribute animal models of disease to interested scientists.

Male and female animals underwent a standardized phenotypic screen to determine the effects of deletion. Twenty three tests were carried out on mutant mice and two significant abnormalities were observed. Fewer than expected homozygous mutant embryos were identified during gestation, and none survived until weaning. The remaining tests were carried out on heterozygous mutant adult mice and no further phenotypes were observed.

References

Further reading

Genes mutated in mice